Outer Range is an American science fiction neo-Western streaming television series created by Brian Watkins and starring Josh Brolin and Imogen Poots. It premiered on Amazon Prime Video on April 15, 2022. In October 2022, the series was renewed for a second season, with Charles Murray taking over Watkins' position as showrunner.

Premise
Royal Abbott is a Wyoming rancher who is fighting for his land and family. He discovers a mysterious black void in the pasture after the arrival of Autumn, a drifter with a connection to Abbott's ranch. While the Abbott family copes with the disappearance of their daughter-in-law Rebecca, they are pushed further to the brink when a rival family, the Tillersons, try to take over their land.

Cast and characters

Main
 Josh Brolin as Royal Abbott, Cecilia Abbott’s husband and father of Rhett and Perry
 Imogen Poots as Autumn, a strange young woman who arrives at the Abbott ranch and camps out on the land
 Lili Taylor as Cecilia Abbott, owner of the Abbott ranch and mother of Rhett and Perry
 Tom Pelphrey as Perry Abbott, Royal's elder son and the father of Amy
 Tamara Podemski as Deputy Sheriff Joy Hawk, the acting sheriff of the county where the town of Wabang is situated.
 Lewis Pullman as Rhett Abbott, Royal's younger son
 Noah Reid as Billy Tillerson, the younger son of the Tillerson family
 Shaun Sipos as Luke Tillerson, the elder son of the Tillerson family
 Will Patton as Wayne Tillerson, the father of Billy and Luke and head of the family
 Isabel Arraiza as Maria Olivares, a bank teller that Rhett is interested in
 Olive Abercrombie as Amy Abbott, the 9-year-old daughter of Perry
 Deirdre O'Connell as Patricia Tillerson, the mother of Billy and Luke, and Wayne's estranged ex-wife
 Kristen Connolly as Rebecca Abbott, Perry's missing wife

Recurring
 Matthew Maher as Deputy Matt
 MorningStar Angeline as Martha Hawk, the wife of Joy Hawk.
 Matt Lauria as Trevor Tillerson
 Hank Rogerson as Kirkland Miller
 Kevin Chamberlin as Karl Cleaver

Production
In February 2020, it was announced that Josh Brolin had signed on to star in Outer Range. The series is executive produced by Brolin, Brian Watkins, Zev Borow, Heather Rae, Robin Sweet, Lawrence Trilling, Amy Seimetz, Tony Krantz, and Brad Pitt through his Plan B Entertainment. In December 2020, it was announced that Lewis Pullman, Noah Reid, Shaun Sipos, and Isabel Arraiza had joined the cast, alongside Brolin, Imogen Poots, Lili Taylor, Tamara Podemski, and Tom Pelphrey.

The series marks Brolin's first television series role in nearly 20 years. It was filmed over the course of eight months in Las Vegas, New Mexico. On October 6, 2022, Amazon renewed the series for a second season.

Danny Bensi and Saunder Jurriaans composed the series' music. Milan Records have released the soundtrack.

Episodes

Release
A teaser trailer was released on March 9, 2022. The first two episodes of the eight-episode first season premiered on Prime Video on April 15, 2022, with two new episodes premiering each week.

Reception 
 Metacritic, which uses a weighted average, assigned a score of 60 out of 100 based on 23 critics, indicating "mixed or average reviews".

References

External links
 
 

2022 American television series debuts
2020s American drama television series
2020s American LGBT-related drama television series
2020s American mystery television series
2020s American science fiction television series
2020s Western (genre) television series
English-language television shows
American thriller television series
Lesbian-related television shows
Neo-Western television series
Television productions suspended due to the COVID-19 pandemic
Television shows filmed in Los Angeles
Television shows filmed in New Mexico
Television shows set in Wyoming
Television shows shot in the Las Vegas Valley
Television series by Amazon Studios
Amazon Prime Video original programming
Science fiction Westerns